Gustavo Miguel Ángel Antoun (born November 11, 1957) is a retired Argentine footballer who played for clubs from Argentina and Chile.

External links
 

1957 births
Living people
Argentine footballers
Argentine expatriate footballers
Club Atlético Vélez Sarsfield footballers
Arsenal de Sarandí footballers
Racing de Córdoba footballers
Instituto footballers
San Luis de Quillota footballers
Expatriate footballers in Chile
Association football goalkeepers
People from Chubut Province